Inguinal glands may refer to,

 Scent glands in even-toed ungulates
 Inguinal lymph nodes